Kissology is a series of DVD/Home Video releases featuring interviews, live performances, music videos and television appearances by the American rock band Kiss.
Kissology Volume One: 1974–1977
Kissology Volume Two: 1978–1991
Kissology Volume Three: 1992–2000
Kissology may also refer to Jigoku-Retsuden, an album also known under this title.